Damascus Time is a 2018 drama film by Iranian director Ebrahim Hatamikia. The plot revolves around an Iranian pilot and his copilot son whose plane is seized by ISIS forces in Syria while carrying a cargo of humanitarian relief supplies to people in a war zone. Hadi Hejazifar, Babak Hamidian and an ensemble of Syrian, Iraqi and Lebanese actors star in the film.

Synopsis 
Ali and his son, Younes, play pilots trying to rescue civilians besieged and attacked by ISIS forces in eastern Syria. The pilots have come to help the townspeople escape in an aging Ilyushin cargo plane.

Cast
 Babak Hamidian
 Hadi Hejazifar
 Khaled El Sayed
 Pierre Dagher
 Laleh Marzban
 Lath El Mofty

Release
The movie seeks to shed light on the reality of Daesh and what the Western media is trying to hide from the world about them.
Hatamikia, Homayunfar and Joseph Salameh, the Lebanese actor who is starring as Abu Omar al-Shishani in the film, attended the ceremony organized at the Kurosh Cineplex.

Awards
At the 2018 Fajr International Film Festival, Ebrahim Hatamikia was co-awarded the Crystal Simorgh for best director. Mohammad-Ali Jafari, IRGC Chief-Commander, congratulated Hatamikia on receiving the Award. The movie won two other awards for Best Composer and Best Sound Effects, and holds the record of being nominated in eight categories.

Reception
Mohammad Javad Zarif, Iranian Minister of Foreign Affairs, and Iran's Quds force commander, Qasem Soleimani described the movie as a "masterpiece."

Lead actor Hadi Hejazifar said that he was not satisfied with his performance in the movie. According to reports, the film is planned to premiere South Korea, Japan, Iraq, and Lebanon.

References

External links
 
 
 

2018 films
Iranian war films
Iranian action films
Films about Islamic State of Iraq and the Levant
Films directed by Ebrahim Hatamikia
2010s war films
Films set in Syria
Films whose director won the Best Directing Crystal Simorgh